Surgères is a railway station in Surgères, France. It is served by both TER Nouvelle-Aquitaine and TGV:

La Rochelle - Gare Montparnasse (TGV Atlantique)
La Rochelle - Poitiers (TER Nouvelle-Aquitaine)

References

Railway stations in Charente-Maritime
Railway stations in France opened in 1857